Michael Lammer decided to not defend his last year's title.
Ramón Delgado defeated Andre Begemann 6–3, 6–4 in the final.

Seeds

Draw

Finals

Top half

Bottom half

References
 Main Draw
 Qualifying Draw

Challenger Varonil Britania Zavaleta - Singles
Challenger Britania Zavaleta
Mex